Kalvirayanpettai is a village in the Thanjavur taluk of Thanjavur district, Tamil Nadu, India.

Demographics 

As per the 2001 census, Kalvirayanpettai had a total population of 1563 with  759 males and  804 females. The sex ratio was 1059. The literacy rate was 75.06.

References 

 
Villages in Thanjavur district
Anbuthiru